Champagne Bricout is a champagne company founded in 1966 by Christian Andreas Kupferberg in Avize, France. It was a subsidiary of Kupferberg Sekt, producing 3 million bottles of champagne in 1998.

History
Martin Financial acquired the company in 1998, but due to financial difficulties, sold it to the financial holding US-Luxembourg Opson Schneider in 2003. Opson Schneider filed for bankruptcy, which caused a scandal unprecedented in Champagne, Following the liquidation of the assets of Pierre Martin, LVMH, and Vranken-Pommery Monopole, 400 hectares of vineyards are now shared, including 200 hectares from Bricout, Avize.

References

External links
 Official website

Champagne producers
French companies established in 1966
French brands
Drink companies of France 
Food and drink companies established in 1966
2003 mergers and acquisitions
1998 mergers and acquisitions